Senator Carson may refer to:

Howard W. Carson (1910–1994), West Virginia State Senate
James Harvey Carson (1808–1884), Virginia State Senate
Julia Carson (1938–2007), Indiana State Senate
Samuel Price Carson (1798–1838), North Carolina State Senate
Sharon Carson (born 1957), New Hampshire State Senate
Wallace P. Carson Jr. (born 1934), Oregon State Senate
William A. Carson (1863–1949), New York State Senate